This is a timeline of Reddit, an entertainment, social networking, and news website where registered community members can submit content, such as text posts or direct links, making it essentially an online bulletin board system.

Major events

Full timeline

References

Reddit